Fish-eating rat can refer to several related semiaquatic South American rodents of tribe Ichthyomyini:
Anotomys, one species:
Ecuador fish-eating rat, fish-eating rat or aquatic rat (A. leander)
Neusticomys, six species: 
 Ferreira's fish-eating rat (N. ferreirai)
 Montane fish-eating rat (N. monticolus)
 Musso's fish-eating rat (N. mussoi)
 Oyapock's fish-eating rat (N. oyapocki)
 Peruvian fish-eating rat (N. peruviensis)
 Venezuelan fish-eating rat (N. venezuelae)

Animal common name disambiguation pages